From A to B is a 2014 multilingual Emirati film written, directed, and produced by Ali F. Mostafa. Set in the United Arab Emirates, the film revolves around three old friends (Jay, Rami & Omar) who travel on an adventurous road trip from Abu Dhabi to Beirut in memory of their lost friend Hadi.

Cast 
Fahad Albutairi as Youssef 'Jay'
Shadi Alfons as Rami
Fadi Rifaai as Omar
Khaled Abol Naga as Senior Syrian Officer
Samer al-Masry as Syrian Rebel Leader
Wonho Chung as Raed
Leem Lubany as Shadya
Maha Abou Ouf as Rami's Mother
Yousra El Lozy as Arwa
Abdulmohsen Alnemr as Youssef's Father
Ali Suliman as Syrian Army Officer
Madeline Zima as Samantha
Ahd Kamel as Rana (credited as Ahd)
Christina Ulfsparre as Julie
Ibrahim Alkhairallah as Mechanic
Ibrahim Mursi as Saudi Officer
Hisham Fageeh as Saudi Officer
Iman Al Shaybani as Joanne

External links 
 Official Twitter account

References

2014 films
Emirati comedy films
Emirati drama films
Emirati adventure films
Road movies
2010s Arabic-language films
2010s English-language films
Films set in Abu Dhabi
Films set in the United Arab Emirates
Films shot in the United Arab Emirates
2014 multilingual films
Emirati multilingual films
Films directed by Ali F. Mostafa